Kaura, also known as Kauda and Chutka, is a folk musical performance indigenous to the hilly regions of Nepal. It is believed to have originated in the Magar community of Rising Ranipokhari, Tanahun. According to historians, it was originally called Kandraha dance. Traditionally associated with the Magar people, it is also performed by the Gurung, Darai, Bhujel and Dura communities. 

Although associated with its distinctive costume, musical instruments and prosody, some have expressed concern that Kaura is losing its authenticity due to perversions introduced by commercialization and external influence, while others have been more optimistic deeming the changes a natural part of the cultural evolution and increasing popularity.

See also 

 Maruni
 Deuda

References

Nepalese culture
Folk dance

Nepalese folk dances
Culture of Gandaki
Magar culture